The Sleep of Death (a.k.a. The Inn of the Flying Dragon) is a 1980 Swedish-Irish historical horror film written and directed by Calvin Floyd and starring Per Oscarsson, Curd Jürgens, Patrick Magee and Marilù Tolo. It is based on the 1872 novella The Room in the Dragon Volant by Sheridan Le Fanu. The film's Swedish title is Ondskans Värdshus.

Plot
In 1815 at the end of the Napoleonic Wars, a young Englishman travels to France in pursuit of a woman, the Countess St. Alyre. Once there he meets some weird characters, including the Marquis D'Armanville, and he begins to experience otherworldly events as a series of murders occur.

Cast
 Per Oscarsson ... Colonel Gaillard
 Patrick Magee ... Marquis
 Curd Jürgens ... Count St. Alyre
 Marilù Tolo ... Countess Elga
 Brendan Price ... Robert Terence
 Niall Toibin ... Sean
 Kay Maclaren ... Old Woman
 Barry Cassins ... The Count's Brother
 Christopher Casson ... Sir Philip Terence
 John Molloy ... Priest
 Ray McAnally ... Inspector Carmingac
 Archie O'Sullivan ... Chemist
 Bill Foley ... Colonel's Orderly
 Jacinta Martín ... First Maid
 Olwen Fouere ... Second Maid

References

External links

1980 films
1980 horror films
Swedish horror films
Irish horror films
English-language Swedish films
English-language Irish films
Films based on works by Sheridan Le Fanu
Films based on Irish novels
1980s Swedish films